The 2020 Sudamérica Rugby Women's Sevens was the 18th edition of the tournament. It was held in Montevideo, Uruguay from 28 to 29 November. Eight teams competed at the tournament, Brazil won their 17th title and cemented their dominance of South America.

Teams

Pool stage

Pool A

Pool B

Finals

Cup Quarterfinals

5th-place semifinals

Final standings

References 

2020 in women's rugby union
2020 rugby sevens competitions
Rugby sevens competitions in South America